Yaroslav Hennadiyovych Yampol (born 21 April 1990) is a Ukrainian professional footballer who plays as an attacking midfielder for Polish III liga side Świt Nowy Dwór Mazowiecki.

Career
Yampol was the member of various Ukrainian national youth football teams. He was included in Ukraine national under-21 football team preliminarily squad for 2013 UEFA European Under-21 Football Championship but got cut from the final squad.

Playing for FC Metalist 1925 Kharkiv, Yampol was recognized as the best player of August 2019 in the Ukrainian First League by PFL. He became a second player of Metalist 1925 to receive such honors.

References

External links
 
 
 

1990 births
Living people
People from Svatove
Ukrainian footballers
Ukraine youth international footballers
Association football midfielders
FC Shakhtar Donetsk players
FC Shakhtar-3 Donetsk players
FC Komunalnyk Luhansk players
FC Kramatorsk players
FC Dinamo Minsk players
FC Oleksandriya players
FC Hirnyk Kryvyi Rih players
FC Cherkashchyna players
PFC Sumy players
FC Zirka Kropyvnytskyi players
FC Hirnyk-Sport Horishni Plavni players
FC Metalist 1925 Kharkiv players
FC Podillya Khmelnytskyi players
Świt Nowy Dwór Mazowiecki players
Ukrainian Premier League players
Ukrainian First League players
Ukrainian Second League players
Belarusian Premier League players
III liga players
Ukrainian expatriate footballers
Expatriate footballers in Belarus
Ukrainian expatriate sportspeople in Belarus
Expatriate footballers in Poland
Ukrainian expatriate sportspeople in Poland
Sportspeople from Luhansk Oblast